Blevice is a municipality and village in Kladno District in the Central Bohemian Region of the Czech Republic. It has about 300 inhabitants.

Geography
It is located in the Prague Plateau. The village lies at the end of a small valley whose slopes are partially covered by forest.

History
The location has been inhabited a long time. As a group of 7 or 8 (today barely noticeable) prehistoric burial barrows in the wood southeast of the villages testifies. They were archaeologically explored in the 19th century. No definite opinion of the age of the barrows can be stated. Estimates vary from late Bronze Age (second half of the 2nd millennium BC) to Slavic period of early Middle Ages (second half of the 1st millennium AD).

The first written mention of Blevice is from 1282. In the 14th century, it was owned by the Vyšehrad Chapter.

Demographics

Transport
The municipality is located away from all major roads. The bus service to Kladno and Kralupy nad Vltavou operates on working days only. There is no railroad in the municipality, the closest is the railway station in Zákolany.

Culture
Between 1865 and 1907, Blevice was a cultural centre that hosted several important concerts. The first public performance of Czech violin virtuoso Jan Kubelík was held in Blevice in 1891. The most significant concert was Kubelík's second concert in 1899, when he was already famous.

Sights

Blevice has a Jewish cemetery located in the southern part of the municipality. Within an enclosure of about  there are about 300 preserved tombstones dating from the early 18th century until 1945. The neighbouring gravedigger's house from 1884 is well preserved and today serves as a private residence. Only a small number of Jewish families lived in Blevice in the 19th century, the cemetery was used mainly by Jews from the nearby town of Velvary.

In the centre of the village there is a small chapel dating from 1746 which has a memorial plaque on its side wall which lists the local victims of World War I.

Gallery

References

External links

Villages in Kladno District